This List of Sporting CP records and statistics provides information about Sporting Clube de Portugal, which is a Portuguese sports club based in Lisbon. The club is particularly renowned for its football branch. With more than 100,000 registered club members, Sporting CP is one of the most successful and popular sports clubs in Portugal. Its teams, athletes, and supporters are often nicknamed Os Leões (The Lions).

Honours

Domestic competitions

Primeira Liga

 Winners (19): 1940–41, 1943–44, 1946–47, 1947–48, 1948–49, 1950–51, 1951–52, 1952–53, 1953–54, 1957–58, 1961–62, 1965–66, 1969–70, 1973–74, 1979–80, 1981–82, 1999–2000, 2001–02, 2020–21
 Runners-up (22): 1934–35, 1938–39, 1939–40, 1941–42, 1942–43, 1944–45, 1949–50, 1959–60, 1960–61, 1967–68, 1970–71, 1976–77, 1984–85, 1994–95, 1996–97, 2005–06, 2006–07, 2007–08, 2008–09, 2013–14, 2015–16, 2021–22

Campeonato de Portugal (*defunct)

 Winners (4): 1922–23, 1933–34, 1935–36, 1937–38
 Runners-up (6): 1922, 1924–25, 1927–28, 1932–33, 1934–35, 1936–37Taça de Portugal 
 Winners (17): 1940–41, 1944–45, 1945–46, 1947–48, 1953–54, 1962–63, 1970–71, 1972–73, 1973–74, 1977–78, 1981–82, 1994–95, 2001–02, 2006–07, 2007–08, 2014–15, 2018–19
 Runners-up (12): 1951–52, 1954–55, 1959–60, 1969–70, 1971–72, 1978–79, 1986–87, 1993–94, 1995–96, 1999–2000, 2011–12, 2017–18Taça da Liga 
 Winners (4): 2017–18, 2018–19, 2020–21, 2021–22
 Runners-up (3): 2007–08, 2008–09, 2022–23Supertaça Cândido de Oliveira 
 Winners (9): 1982, 1987, 1995, 2000, 2002, 2007, 2008, 2015, 2021
 Runners-up (2): 1980, 2019Taça Império Winners (1): 1943–44Taça Monumental "O Século" Winners (2): 1948, 1953

Regional competitionsCampeonato de Lisboa Winners (19): 1915, 1919, 1922, 1923, 1925, 1928, 1931, 1934, 1935, 1936, 1937, 1938, 1939, 1941, 1942, 1943, 1945, 1947, 1948Taça de Honra Winners (13): 1915, 1916, 1917, 1948, 1962, 1964, 1966, 1971, 1985, 1991, 1992, 2014, 2015Campeonato de reservas Winners (16): 1934–35, 1937–38, 1939–40, 1941–42, 1958–59, 1959–60, 1960–61, 1961–62, 1963–64, 1966–67, 1967–68, 1968–69, 1973–74, 1983–84, 1984–85, 1985–86Campeonatos da 2ª Categoria Winners (3): 1934–35, 1940–41, 1945–46Campeonatos da 3ª CategoriaWinners (2): 1923–24, 1930–31Campeonatos da 4ª CategoriaWinners (2): 1911–12, 1912–13Taça Mutilados de GuerraWinners (1): 1917–18 (Provisional)Taça LisboaWinners (1): 1930–31

European competitionsEuropean Cup Winners' Cup Winners (1): 1963–64Intertoto Cup Winners (1): 1968 Intertoto CupIberian Cup Winners (1): 2000Small club World Cup Winners (1): 1981UEFA Cup Runners-up (1): 2004–05Latin Cup Runners-up (1): 1949

Friendly competitionsTeresa Herrera Trophy Winners (1): 1961Iberian Trophy (Badajoz, Spain) Winners (2): 1967, 1970
 Runners-up (1): 2005Trofeo Internacional Montilla-Moriles (Córdoba, Spain) Winners (1): 1969Tournament of Bulgaria Winners (1): 1981Tournament City San Sebastián Winners (1): 1991Trofeo Ciudad de Vigo Winners (1): 2001
 Runners-up (1): 1977Guadiana Trophy Winners (3): 2005, 2006, 2008Colombino Trophy Winners (1): 2006Trofeo Santiago Bernabéu Runners-up (1): 2008Fenway Football Challenge Runners-up (1): 2010Barclays New York Challenge Winners (1): 2010

Players

Competitive, professional matches only. Players in bold are still active.

Appearances
Most appearances: 494 – Hilário
Most appearances in a season: 56 – João Moutinho

Overall appearances

 Goalscorers 
Most goals scored: 544 – Fernando Peyroteo
Most league goals in a season: 46 – Héctor Yazalde
Most goals scored in a match: 9 – Fernando Peyroteo

Overall scorers

Overall scorers (foreign players)

Team records

MatchesFirst European match: Sporting 3 – 3 Partizan de Belgrado, Estádio Nacional, Jamor, 1955

Record winsRecord League win: Sporting 14–0 Leça, 1941–42Record Portuguese Cup win: Sporting 21–0 Mindelense, 1/8 Finals, 1970–71Record League Cup win: Sporting 6–0 União da Madeira, group stage, 2017–18Record European win: Sporting 16–1 APOEL, 1963–64 (European Record)Record Portuguese Supercup win: Sporting 6–1''' Braga, away leg, 1981–82

League, Cup and Europe History

Recent seasons

Notes

References

Records and statistics